Tirumala Krishna idol is one of the idols in the Tirumala Venkateswara Temple, Andhra Pradesh, India. While the temple is dedicated to worship of lord Vishnu as Venkateswara, it contains the idols of some of Vishnu's other avatars - Krishna and Rama. The temple also has the idol of Rukmini, wife of Lord Krishna.

Idol description
The idol of Lord Krishna is seen in the navanitha nritya (celestial dance) pose of a child. The lord is seen in the dancing pose with his left hand stretched out in a dancing pose and the left leg placed on the pedestal. The right leg is bent at the knee and doesn't rest on the pedestal. The right hand holds a dollop of butter.

Rukmini Idol
The idol of Rukmini devi has a lotus in the left hand while the right hand is in the blessing pose. The idol is on a lotus pedestal. The details of the exact date when the idol was consecrated, the history of the idol and whether it was found/made along with the Krishna idol is not known.

Idol history
There are no records on the exact date when the idol was consecrated but the earliest record indicate that the idol was offered naivedyam (food offerings) in 1100 A.D. on occasion of Krishna Jayanthi.

Seva to Idol
The idol of Sri Krishna does not receive main attention in the daily prayers of the temple. Even the daily naivedyam to the idol is offered to the main deity before attributing it to the Krishna idol. The same practice is followed for the Rama idol in the temple. During the annual Koil Alwar Thirumanjanam (cleansing of the temple), the idols are removed from the garbha griha (sanctum sanctorum) and replaced after the place is cleaned and consecrated with holy spices.  The idol receives attention during the Dhanurmasa when the Ekanta Seva is performed to the Krishna idol instead of Bhoga Srinivasa idol. 

The Krishna idol receives direct offerings outside the garbha griha  on various occasions.
 Teppotsavam: During the annual Teppotsavam (float festival), the second day is dedicated to the idols of Lord Krishna and Rukmini. The idols are brought to the Swami Pushkarini (holy lake to the north of the temple) and taken on a float to the mandapam in the middle of the lake for prayers.
 Vasanthotsavam: During the annual festival, the idols of Lord Krishna and Rukmini join Malayappa swami and consorts and Rama idol on the third day on a procession around the four streets surrounding the temple and returned to the vasanta mandapam.
 Krishna Jayanthi: After special prayers, the idols of Lord Krishna and his consort Rukmini are bought on a procession around the temple to mark the celebration of Krishna Jayanthi - the birth date of Lord Krishna.

References

Tirumala Venkateswara Temple
Tirumala Idols
Krishna
Krishna in art